Opostega rezniki is a moth of the family Opostegidae. It was described by Koslov in 1985. It is known from Kazakhstan.

References

Opostegidae
Moths described in 1985